The Campaign for Safe Cosmetics is an umbrella coalition of groups with a focus on perceived risks of chemicals used in cosmetics.

Founding campaign members include Alliance for a Healthy Tomorrow, the Breast Cancer Fund, Commonweal, Environmental Working Group, Friends of the Earth, National Black Environmental Justice Network, National Environmental Trust, and Women's Voices for the Earth.

History 
The Campaign for Safe Cosmetics consumer campaign began with a campaign over presence of phthalates, believed to impair fertility and be potentially harmful to developing humans, in cosmetics.

The release of the 2002 report and the succeeding studies that supported its findings prompted a coalition of public health, educational, religious, labor, women's, environmental, and consumer groups to call for consumer health protection from authorities and safer cosmetics from manufacturers.

Actions 
In February 2003, the European Union (EU) passed a new amendment to their Cosmetics Directive that prohibits the use of known or suspected carcinogens, mutagens and reproductive toxins (CMRs) from cosmetics. This amendment went into force in September 2004.

In the spring of 2004, members of the Campaign for Safe Cosmetics and more than 50 other organizations signed a letter asking cosmetics companies and personal care product companies to sign the Compact for Safe Cosmetics (Compact for the Global Production of Safer Health and Beauty Products), a pledge to remove toxic chemicals and replace them with safer alternatives in every market they serve.

At least 1,500 cosmetic companies became members of this compact. The initiative, however, had to be closed down due to the amount of information that needed to be processed for each new company and new product introduced to the market.

On February 8, 2007, representatives of the Campaign for Safe Cosmetics and environmentalist David Steinman held a press conference at the National Press Club in Washington, D.C. regarding the presence of 1,4-dioxane in children's and adult's bath and beauty products. The press conference called for official Food and Drug Administration (FDA) oversight of the cosmetics and personal care products industry, which is currently subject only to suggestions from the FDA.

References 

 Cone, Marla, “Testing finds traces of carcinogen in bath products”, Los Angeles Times, 2/9/07. http://www.latimes.com/news/printedition/asection/la-na-bath9feb09,1,2514820.story?coll=la-news-a_section, accessed 12-12-07.
 Malkin, Stacy. Not Just a Pretty Face: The Ugly Side of the Beauty Industry, New Society Publishers (2007), pp. 23, 25, 38, 41, 45–50, 93, 95–98, 109.
 Singer, Natasha, “Should You Trust Your Makeup?” The New York Times, 2/15/07. https://www.nytimes.com/2007/02/15/fashion/15sside.html, accessed 12-12-07.

External links
 www.safecosmetics.org

Cosmetics
Consumer rights organizations
Public health organizations
Health campaigns